BMC Medical Informatics and Decision Making is an open-access scientific journal covering all areas of medical informatics, biostatistics, and computer science. 
According to the Journal Citation Reports, the journal had a 2020 impact factor of 2.796. The editor-in-chief is Piero Lo Monaco.

References

External links 
BMC Medical Informatics and Decision Making official website
Scopus.com - Source details: BMC Medical Informatics and Decision Making
Scimagojr.com - BMC Medical Informatics and Decision Making

Biomedical informatics journals
English-language journals
BioMed Central academic journals
Publications established in 2000
Computer science journals